Out On The Floor is a single by Dobie Gray. Since its release in 1966, it has become significant as a popular northern soul song. It has been referred to as the song that defines northern soul.

Background
The song was released in May, 1966 as a single backed by "No Room to Cry" on Charger CRG-115. It was re-issued on the Black Magic label in 1975 (see record label).

It charted twice in the UK. The first time was in 1975, when it reached No. 42, spending 8 weeks in the chart. The second time was in 1983, when it settled in at No. 95.

References in popular culture etc.
In Nick Hornby's book, Juliet, Naked, the song is referred to as the "National Anthem of Northern". It is also mentioned in the book Oil and Honey: The Education of an Unlikely Activist by Bill McKibben, Last Days of Disco by David F. Ross, and more.

Releases

References

1966 songs
1966 singles
1975 singles
Northern soul songs
Dobie Gray songs